The Mixed relay of the Biathlon World Championships 2011 was held on March 3, 2011 at 16:30 local time. 26 nations participated. The two participating women athletes raced over 2 × 6 km, while the men's distance was 2 × 7.5 km.

Results

References

Biathlon World Championships 2011
Mixed sports competitions